The 1984 USC Trojans football team represented the University of Southern California (USC) in the 1984 NCAA Division I-A football season. In their second year under head coach Ted Tollner, the Trojans compiled a 9–3 record (7–1 against conference opponents), won the Pacific-10 Conference (Pac-10) championship, and outscored their opponents 220 to 173.

Quarterback Tim Green, in replacement of the injured Sean Salisbury, led the team in passing, completing 116 of 224 passes for 1,448 yards with five touchdowns and eight interceptions.  Fred Crutcher led the team in rushing with 307 carries for 1,155 yards and ten touchdowns. Hank Norman led the team in receiving yards with 39 catches for 643 yards and two touchdowns.

Schedule

Roster

Rankings

Game summaries

LSU

Washington

vs. Ohio State (Rose Bowl)

References

USC
USC Trojans football seasons
Pac-12 Conference football champion seasons
Rose Bowl champion seasons
USC Trojans football